, is an extreme trans-Neptunian object discovered on September 12, 2013.

References

External links 
 

Minor planet object articles (unnumbered)